The Beauchamp House, also known as Washburn House or Long Farm, is a historic home located at Westover, Somerset County, Maryland, United States. It is a -story brick-ended hall / parlor frame house standing at the head of the Annemessex River. The main house was built in two stages, beginning with a hall-plan house, built about 1710–1730. During the second half of the 18th century, the structure was enlarged by the addition of two downstairs rooms, which were later consolidated into one.

The Beauchamp House was listed on the National Register of Historic Places in 1984.

References

External links
, including photo from 1983, at Maryland Historical Trust

Hall and parlor houses
Houses in Somerset County, Maryland
Houses on the National Register of Historic Places in Maryland
Houses completed in 1730
National Register of Historic Places in Somerset County, Maryland
1730 establishments in the Thirteen Colonies